Jurin is a village in northern Syria, located in the Shathah Subdistrict of the Suqaylabiyah District in the Hama Governorate. According to the Syria Central Bureau of Statistics (CBS), Jurin had a population of 2,326 in the 2004 census. Its inhabitants are predominantly Alawites.

References 

Alawite communities in Syria
Populated places in al-Suqaylabiyah District